Mount Louise is part of the low plateaus of the Appalachian Mountains very close to the municipality of Saints-Martyrs-Canadiens; it is located in the Arthabaska Regional County Municipality, in the administrative region of Centre-du-Québec in Quebec, in Canada.

Toponymy
The toponym "Mont Louise" was formalized on December 5, 1968 by the Commission de toponymie du Québec.

References 

Appalachian summits
Landforms of Centre-du-Québec
Arthabaska Regional County Municipality